Aurora OS or Russian Open mobile platform (OMP) is a Russian Linux-based smartphone operating system derived from Sailfish OS. Aurora OS is owned by Rostelecom and is developed for business and governmental use. The operating system was branched from Sailfish OS into its own version in 2019. As a difference from the Sailfish platform, the operating system has its own application store and it is integrated with the Russian government's official radio network ERA.

History 
In 2016, Jolla started a development project whose goal was to localize the Sailfish platform in Russia. For this, its own company was founded and the Russian-language version was called Sailfish Mobile OS RUS. The first users of the platform were the Russian Post. In 2018, the Russian state applied for a secure mobile phone operating system for official use. Sailfish Mobile OS RUS was chosen and Rostelecom was the company that developed it. In 2019, the platform was renamed Aurora OS. In 2021, Jolla announced that they had left the project and was no longer developing it. In November 2021, according to Nokiamob.net, there would be around 400,000 devices using it.

However, in 2022 Vedomosti reported that sales of the latest model Scale Trustphone T1 to consumers were minimal. Also, because of sanctions set by the 2022 Russian invasion of Ukraine the ability to produce the hardware needed for the newer models is limited. Development of Trustphone T2 with domestic ARM processor Scythian by  SPC Elvis was halted because sanctions and overheating problems.

Devices 
Known devices using Aurora OS are

Tablets	
 Aquarius Cmp NS208
 Aquarius CMP NS220
 Aquarius CMP NS220 v5.2
 BytErg МВК-2020
 F+ Life Tab Plus
 INOI T8 Tablet (discontinued)

Phones
 Qtech QMP-M1-N
 Qtech QMP-M1-N IP68
 MIG С55 (discontinued)
 INOI 5i pro 
 INOI R7 (discontinued)
 Blackview bs6000s (discontinued)
 F+ R570
 Scale Trustphone T1 / AYYA T1
 Aquarius NS M11

References

External links 
 Tadadviser, Rostelecom has integrated devices based on the Aurora OS into the O2O - Infrastructure Operator for Operators project

ARM operating systems
Mobile operating systems
Embedded Linux distributions